Jimmy Roberts (16 April 1883 – 16 September 1961) was an Australian rules footballer who played with Geelong in the Victorian Football League (VFL).

Notes

External links 

1883 births
1961 deaths
Australian rules footballers from Victoria (Australia)
Geelong Football Club players
Rutherglen Football Club players